Sarah White is a singer-songwriter based in Richmond, Virginia, whose music can be roughly characterized as folk or alt-country.

Biography
Sarah White was born in Warrenton, Virginia, and relocated as a child to Monroe County, West Virginia. When she returned to Virginia she became involved with the growing music community in Charlottesville — a town where she "grew up" and lived in "off and on for years." There she played in several bands towards the end of the 90's (White Trash Cookin', Pat Nixon, Miracle Penny).

Record label Jagjaguwar, originally based out of Charlottesville before moving to Indiana to merge with Secretly Canadian, released her first solo album in 1997 – a collection of lo-fi four-track recordings made over a 3-year period – dubbed All My Skies Are Blue.

In 2000, she released her second album, entitled Bluebird, also on Jagjaguwar. The record garnered her a wide range of positive reviews and comparisons to artists like Cat Power and Edith Frost. Later that year she recorded and self-released Pickin' Strummin' And Singin' ... The Versatile Sarah White which was a collection of early country standards and traditional songs.

After remaining fairly quiet for the next several years, White returned with a new band, Sarah White & the Pearls, in 2004 with the self-released You're It EP which focused even further on melodic writing and incorporated the more traditional folk and country song structures. In 2006 she completed her next full-length album with The Pearls, White Light, which was released by Antenna Farm Records. The Richmond Times-Dispatch called her third full-length album "an unassailable collection of absolutely unforgettable songs, the product of White's talent and tenacity."

Of the title track, White says:

White will release her first full-length album in over 10 years on August 3, 2018. High Flyer Recorded at Montrose Studio in Richmond, Virginia, features a dozen of White's "best songs" backed by Daniel Clarke (K.d. lang, Ryan Adams) on piano and keyboard, and Charles Arthur (Slaid Cleaves) on guitars – with vocals by Carl Anderson and Michael York of Sleepwalkers. Dave Matthews sings with White on "Sweetheart". Stewart Myers, who produced the album, also provided bass.

White also performs with Sían Richards in the Acorn Sisters.

Awards and distinctions 
Sarah White's song Sweetheart won best song in Mountain Stage's annual Newsong Festival in 2007.

Discography
All My Skies Are Blue (Jagjaguwar, 1997)
Bluebird (Jagjaguwar, 2000)
You're It (2004)
White Light (2006)
High Flyer (2018)

Compilations
Folk Music for the End of the World (2006)
Even Cowgirls Get the Blues (2007)

References

External links
 
 Unforgettable sound of Sarah White, Richmond Times-Dispatch, November 15, 2007.  Retrieved December 10, 2007.

American alternative country singers
American women country singers
American country singer-songwriters
Musicians from Charlottesville, Virginia
People from Warrenton, Virginia
Living people
Singer-songwriters from Virginia
Year of birth missing (living people)
Jagjaguwar artists
21st-century American women